Rev. Leonard Monk Isitt (4 January 1855 – 29 July 1937) was a Member of Parliament of the New Zealand Liberal Party. He was a Methodist minister and an advocate of prohibition (temperance), in association with Tommy Taylor and his brother, Rev. Frank Isitt.

Early life
He was born in Bedford, England, in 1855. His parents were James Isitt, a butcher, and Rebecca Isitt (née Cole). He lost his father at age two and his mother when he was twelve. He was educated at Bedford Modern School. His brother Frank emigrated to New Zealand in 1870 as a Methodist minister, and in 1875, Leonard Isitt followed him. His brother's daughter, Kate Isitt, later worked for him as his private secretary.

Member of Parliament

Leonard Isitt took over Taylor's parliamentary electorate of Christchurch North in a 1911 by-election after Tommy Taylor died. He held the seat, first as an Independent then as a Liberal until he retired in 1925.

Isitt was a member of the Legislative Council from 1925 to his death in 1937. Isitt and George Witty were both appointed to the Legislative Council by Gordon Coates on 28 October 1925; shortly before the 1925 election on 4 November. Both were Liberals but their retirement removed "a source of some bitterness from the Party’s ranks". Gordon Coates was Reform, and both of their former seats went to Reform candidates.

After Witty, Henry Holland of the Reform Party represented the Christchurch North electorate.

In 1935, he was awarded the King George V Silver Jubilee Medal.

Family and death
Isitt married Agnes Caverhill on 14 May 1881 at New Plymouth. Her parents were Frances and John Caverhill. They had two sons and one daughter. Frances Isitt (1889–1960) was their eldest child. Sir Leonard Isitt (1891–1976) became a prominent Air Force commander. Willard Isitt (1894–1916), a rifleman in the New Zealand Rifle Brigade, was killed during World War I in France on 31 October 1916. Their daughter was the mother to Sir Leonard Thornton who became Chief of Defence Staff for the New Zealand Defence Force.

Leonard Isitt died on 29 July 1937 in Christchurch and was buried at Linwood Cemetery. His wife died a year later at their residence in Cashmere.

Footnotes

Notes

References

Further reading

Works by Isitt

Works about Isitt

Further reading notes

External links

Photo of Rev Leonard Isitt

1855 births
1937 deaths
People educated at Bedford Modern School
19th-century Methodist ministers
Burials at Linwood Cemetery, Christchurch
Independent MPs of New Zealand
Members of the New Zealand Legislative Council
English emigrants to New Zealand
New Zealand journalists
New Zealand Liberal Party MPs
New Zealand Methodists
New Zealand temperance activists
New Zealand Liberal Party MLCs
New Zealand MPs for Christchurch electorates
People from Bedford
Members of the New Zealand House of Representatives
Isitt–Caverhill family